At the 1906 Summer Olympics in Athens, two weightlifting events were contested.   Now called the Intercalated Games, the 1906 Games are no longer considered as an official Olympic Games by the International Olympic Committee.

Medal summary

Medal table

References

1906 Intercalated Games events
1906
International weightlifting competitions hosted by Greece
1906 in weightlifting